The Orville T. Waring House is a historic building located at 900 Park Avenue in the city of Plainfield in Union County, New Jersey. Built in 1881, it was added to the National Register of Historic Places on May 14, 1979, for its significance in architecture, commerce, and industry. Orville Taylor Waring was an oil industry pioneer. The house was added as a contributing property to the Van Wyck Brooks Historic District on December 10, 1985.

See also
National Register of Historic Places listings in Union County, New Jersey

References

Plainfield, New Jersey
Houses in Union County, New Jersey
Victorian architecture in New Jersey
National Register of Historic Places in Union County, New Jersey
Houses on the National Register of Historic Places in New Jersey
Houses completed in 1881
New Jersey Register of Historic Places